CXOU J164710.2−455216 is an anomalous X-ray pulsar and magnetar in the massive galactic open cluster Westerlund 1. It is the brightest X-ray source in the cluster, and was discovered in 2005 in observations made by the Chandra X-ray Observatory. The Westerlund 1 cluster is believed to have formed in a single burst of star formation, implying that the progenitor star must have had a mass in excess of 40 solar masses. The fact that a neutron star was formed instead of a black hole implies that more than 95% of the star's original mass must have been lost before or during the supernova that produced the magnetar.

On 21 September 2006 the Swift satellite detected a 20ms soft gamma-ray burst in Westerlund 1. Fortuitously, XMM-Newton observations had been made four days earlier, and repeat observations 1.5 days after the burst revealed the magnetar to be the source of the burst, with the X-ray luminosity increasing by a factor of 100 during the outburst.

References

  
 cxo-j164710.2-455216

Ara (constellation)
Anomalous X-ray pulsars
?
Magnetars